BlogTalkRadio is a web-based platform that allows podcasters and radio sites and talk show hosts to create live and on-demand talk format content for distribution on the web and podcast distribution channels.  Its claim to fame is a web-based 'studio' that allows its content creators to host multi-participant broadcasts using a computer and a phone.

Development
After setting up a blog to update his family on his ailing father, Alan Levy, a former accountant and telecommunications executive, launched the service in August 2006, as a way to allow audio content creators to communicate directly with their audiences in real time.

Service
The service allows up to five callers at a time, although unlimited participants can listen in. Shows stream directly from the host page during live broadcasts, and are archived as podcasts. Previous shows can be streamed, downloaded directly or subscribed to as podcasts via RSS through any podcatcher like Juice, Stitcher or iTunes. The service also provides promotional badges and flash player code for placement on blogs, Twitter, Facebook and other Social networking sites.

As of February 1, 2011, only 30-minute podcasts will be free to broadcast, and the ability to stream longer than 30-minutes will require a monthly subscription service.

Cinch
Cinch allows anyone to dial a "Cinch number" and record a podcast with a built-in RSS feed without any preregistration or prior setup.  This service has been discontinued.

Reception
Howard Kurtz, in his "Media Notes" column in The Washington Post, wrote about BlogTalkRadio that "The process is nearly idiot-proof. The host logs on to a Web page with a password, types in when he wants the show to air, and then, using a garden-variety phone, calls a special number. The computer screen lists the phone numbers of guests or listeners calling in, and the host can put as many as six on the air at once by clicking a mouse. Listeners can download a podcast version later [...] a populist force in cyberspace."

Condé Nast Portfolio referred to BlogTalkRadio as a site that "has become the dominant player in the latest media trend, one that allows anyone with a Web connection to host a talk show on any topic at any time of day. It is the newest form of new media; the audio version of the internet blog." In the same article, however, the profitability of the service was called into question as BlogTalkRadio was then operating at a loss.

See also
Justin.tv
Livestream
Lifecasting (video stream)
Tinychat
Ustream
Sport Your Argument

Notable networks
BizTalkRadio
The Motley Fool
Rob Has a Podcast
SB Nation
Kyle Kulinski

References

External links
BlogTalkRadio

Talk radio stations
Podcasting software
2006 software